Una O'Donoghue born 1981 in Lissarda, County Cork, Ireland is a camogie player, winner of All Ireland camogie medals in 2002, when she was team captain, 2005, 2006, 2008 and 2009. She led her club to their first county Senior championship title in 2001. She is the holder of Ashbourne Cup and league honours with UCC. as well as National League medals with Cork. She has won three county Senior medals in total with her club.

References

External links 
 Official Camogie Website
 Video highlights of 2009 championship Part One and part two
 Video Highlights of 2009 All Ireland Senior Final
 Report of All Ireland final in Irish Times Independent and Examiner

 

1982 births
Living people
Cork camogie players
UCC camogie players